Frederick W. Kubasta (June 8, 1877 – April 8, 1970) was a member of the Wisconsin State Assembly.

Biography
Kubasta was born on June 8, 1877 in New Lisbon, Wisconsin. In 1882, he moved with his parents to Merrill, Wisconsin. On August 30, 1905, Kubasta married Nanna Hals. They had two children.

He died at his home in Rocky River, Ohio on April 8, 1970.

Career
Kubasta was a member of the Assembly during the 1907, 1909 and 1915 sessions. Additionally, he was Postmaster of Merrill and a member of the county board of supervisors and Chairman of the Republican county committee of Lincoln County, Wisconsin.

References

People from New Lisbon, Wisconsin
People from Merrill, Wisconsin
Republican Party members of the Wisconsin State Assembly
County supervisors in Wisconsin
Wisconsin postmasters
1877 births
1970 deaths
Burials at Lakewood Park Cemetery